Viverravus ("ancestor of Viverra") is an extinct genus of placental mammals from extinct subfamily Viverravinae within extinct family Viverravidae, that lived in North America, Europe and Asia from the middle Paleocene to middle Eocene.

Classification and phylogeny

Taxonomy

Phylogeny
The phylogenetic relationships of genus Viverravus are shown in the following cladogram:

See also
 Mammal classification
 Viverravinae

References

Paleocene mammals of North America
Viverravids
Fossil taxa described in 1872
Taxa named by Othniel Charles Marsh
Prehistoric placental genera